Unstoppable is the debut studio album by Colombian singer Karol G. The album was released on October 27, 2017, through Universal Music Latin Entertainment.

Background

After the commercial failure of her 2013 mixtape Super Single, Karol G finally gained traction with "Amor de Dos" in collaboration with Nicky Jam. The following year, Karol G released stand alone singles and started working on her debut album. In 2015, collaborative songs with De La Ghetto and Andy Rivera were released. In January 2016, Giraldo was signed with Universal Music Latin Entertainment. 

Since February 2016, Karol G began teasing the release of "Casi Nada" through her social media accounts, and on March 10, 2016 the official cover art and release date was revealed. The song was released on March 18, 2016, as the album's lead single. On August 26, 2016, "Muñeco de Lego" was released as the following single. "Hello", a collaboration with Puerto Rican rapper Ozuna was released as the album's third single on November 4, 2016. "A Ella" was released on May 5, 2017, as the fifth single. "Ahora Me Llama" with Puerto Rican rapper and singer Bad Bunny was released on May 26, 2017. "Eres Mi Todo" with Kevin Roldán was released on July 6, 2017, as the last single before the album's release.

On October 11, 2017, Karol G announced the release date and title for her debut album, Unstoppable. Giraldo later explained the meaning behind the album's title, stating:

On October 17, 2017, the track list was revealed, featuring guest appearances from Cosculluela, Ozuna, Bad Bunny, Kevin Roldán and Quavo. The album was officially released on October 27, 2017.

Commercial performance
Unstoppable debuted at number two on the US Top Latin Albums chart, earning 4,000 album-equivalent units (including 3,000 copies in pure album sales) in its first week, according to Nielsen Music. The album also debuted at number 192 on the US Billboard 200 and number two on the US Latin Rhythm Albums charts respectively. On November 8, 2018, the album was certified double platinum by the Latin Recording Industry Association of America (RIAA) for combined sales and album-equivalent units of over 120,000 units in the United States.

Track listing 
Credits were adapted from Tidal.

Personnel
Credits were adapted from Tidal.

Performers
 Karol G – primary artist
 Cosculluela – featured artist 
 Ozuna – featured artist 
 Bad Bunny – featured artist 
 Kevin Roldán – featured artist 
 Quavo – featured artist 

Technical
 Mosty – mixing engineer 
 Jaycen Joshua – mixing engineer 

Production
 Ovy On The Drums – producer 
 Andrés Torres – producer 
 Mauricio Rengifo – producer

Charts

Weekly charts

Year-end charts

Certifications

References

2017 debut albums
Universal Music Latino albums
Karol G albums
Albums produced by Ovy on the Drums